Liberal arts colleges are primarily colleges or universities with an emphasis upon undergraduate study in the liberal arts. The Encyclopædia Britannica Concise offers the following definition of the liberal arts as a, "college or university curriculum aimed at imparting general knowledge and developing general intellectual capacities, in contrast to a professional, vocational, or technical curriculum." Although the genesis for what is known today as the liberal arts college began in Europe, the term is commonly associated with the United States. Liberal arts colleges are found in countries all over the world as well. See the list (link) of international members of the Association of American Colleges and Universities for other institutions offering liberal arts education programs.

A

Afghanistan
American University of Afghanistan in Kabul

Australia
Campion College in Sydney
Charles Sturt University
University of Sydney
University of Adelaide

B

Bangladesh
 Asian University for Women in Chittagong
 University of Liberal Arts Bangladesh in Dhaka

Belgium
Vesalius College in Brussels

Bulgaria
American University in Bulgaria in Blagoevgrad

C

Canada
Acadia University in Wolfville, Nova Scotia
Bishop's University in Lennoxville, Québec
Brescia University College (affiliated college of the University of Western Ontario)
The College of the Humanities at Carleton University in Ottawa, Ontario
Cape Breton University in Sydney, Nova Scotia
Columbia College in Vancouver, British Columbia
Crandall University in Moncton, New Brunswick
Dominican University College in Ottawa, Ontario (an affiliate of Carleton University)
Glendon College in Toronto, Ontario (a division of York University)
Huron University College (affiliated college of the University of Western Ontario)
King's University College (affiliated college of the University of Western Ontario)
The King's University in Edmonton, Alberta
Lakehead University in Thunder Bay, Ontario
Laurentian University in Greater Sudbury, Ontario
Mount Allison University in Sackville, New Brunswick
Nipissing University in North Bay, Ontario
Our Lady Seat of Wisdom Academy (now College) in Barry's Bay, Ontario
Providence College and Theological Seminary in Otterburne, Manitoba
Quest University Canada in Squamish, British Columbia
Redeemer University College in Ancaster, Ontario
Saint Mary's University (Halifax) in Halifax, Nova Scotia
St. Francis Xavier University in Antigonish, Nova Scotia
St. Thomas More College in Saskatoon, Saskatchewan (a federated college of the University of Saskatchewan)
St. Thomas University in Fredericton, New Brunswick
Trent University in Peterborough, Ontario
Trinity Western University in Langley, British Columbia
Tyndale University College in Toronto, Ontario
Université Sainte-Anne in Church Point, Nova Scotia
University of Alberta Augustana Faculty, Alberta
University of King's College in Halifax, Nova Scotia
University of Lethbridge in Lethbridge, Alberta
Booth University College in Winnipeg, Manitoba

Chile
Pontifical Catholic University of Chile

China
NYU Shanghai in Pudong, Shanghai

Czech Republic
Faculty of Humanities, Charles University, Prague

E

Ecuador
Universidad San Francisco de Quito

Egypt
American University in Cairo

Estonia
Tallinn University Catherine's College

F

France
American University of Paris
Chavagnes Studium

G

Georgia
Agricultural University of Georgia

Germany
Bard College Berlin in Berlin
University College Freiburg in Freiburg
Witten/Herdecke University in Witten
Leuphana University in Lüneburg

Ghana
Ashesi University

Greece
American College of Thessaloniki

H

Hong Kong

Centennial College
Lingnan University
Hong Kong Shue Yan University

Hungary
McDaniel College Budapest

I

India

 Ahmedabad University in Ahmedabad
 Ashoka University in Sonepat
 Flame University in Pune
 Krea University in Sri City
 Symbiosis School for Liberal Arts in Pune

Iraq
The American University of Iraq – Sulaimani

Israel
Shalem College in Jerusalem

Italy
American University of Rome 
John Cabot University

Indonesia
Universitas Pelita Harapan

J

Japan
Soka University of Japan, Tokyo
The College of Liberal Arts, International Christian University in Tokyo
College of Arts and Sciences, The University of Tokyo (Komaba campus) in Tokyo
International College of Liberal Arts, Yamanashi Gakuin University in Kofu

L

Lithuania
Vytautas Magnus University in Kaunas
LCC International University in Klaipeda

N

The Netherlands

Amsterdam University College in Amsterdam
Erasmus University College in Rotterdam
University College Groningen in Groningen
Leiden University College The Hague in The Hague
University College ATLAS, Academy of Technology, Liberal Arts & Sciences in Enschede
University College Maastricht in Maastricht
University College Roosevelt in Middelburg
University College Utrecht, in Utrecht
University of Tilburg in Tilburg

P

Pakistan
Forman Christian College in Lahore
Habib University in Karachi

Philippines

Poland
University of Warsaw in Warsaw

R

Russia
Smolny College in St. Petersburg

S

Singapore

 Yale-NUS College

Slovakia
 BISLA in Bratislava

Spain
 Saint Louis University Madrid Campus

Sweden
 Gotland University College
 University of Gothenburg

Switzerland
 Franklin University Switzerland

T

Thailand
Mahidol University International College

U

United Kingdom
New College of the Humanities
Richmond University
St. Mary's University College (Belfast), Queen's University Belfast

United Arab Emirates
New York University, (Abu Dhabi)

United States

References 

Liberal arts colleges